

Events
 Legbrannock Waggonway opened by William Dixon (senior) to move coal from Legbrannock colliery on the Woodhall Estate to the Monkland Canal at Calderbank, an early example of a railway in Scotland.

Births

March births
 March 10 – George Hudson, English railway financier, "The Railway King" (d. 1871).

July births 
 July 15 – Sidney Breese, U.S. senator from Illinois known as the "father of the Illinois Central Railroad" (d. 1878).
 July 29 – George Bradshaw, English cartographer, printer and publisher and the originator of the railway timetable (d. 1853).

Deaths

References